Light on Me is a 2021 South Korean streaming television series starring Lee Sae-on, Kang Yoo-seok, Choe Chan-yi and Go Woo-jin. Two episodes were released each Tuesday and Thursday from June 29 to August 19, 2021, on the WATCHA app in South Korea and on the video streaming website Viki in western countries.

The drama was based on the homonym boys' love dating sim mobile game by DAY7.

It was featured on Teen Vogue's best BL dramas of 2021 list.

Synopsis
Woo Tae-kyung is a 18-year-old Korean average boy who has no friends. One day, his teacher approached him in order to help him. He then suggests Tae-kyung to join the school's student council. The task is not easy, since one of the members is Noh Shin-woo, who resents a previous encounter with him. The president of the council, though, is very receptive and tries making Tae-kyung and Shin-woo get along. The council is also formed by Namgoong Shi-won, an extroverted humorous guy who also makes an effort so Tae-kyung properly joins them. Tae-kyung, with his new set of friends, proceeds to enjoy his new social life and starts questioning if he may or may not like one of his fellow council members.

Cast

Main
 Lee Sae-on as Woo Tae-kyung
 Kang Yoo-seok as Noh Shin-woo
 Choe Chan-yi as Shin Da-on
 Go Woo-jin as Namgoong Shi-won

Supporting
 Lee Ki-hyun as Seo Haet-bit
 Yang Seo-hyun as Lee Soo-hee

Original soundtrack
The soundtrack for the series was released by Music&New on August 20, 2021.

Episodes

International release
 In Japan, the series was released weekly on AbemaTV.
 In Thailand and the Philippines, the series was released weekly on WeTV.
 In India, the series was released for streaming on MX Player in Tamil, Telugu and Hindi dubbed versions.
 In western countries, the series was released weekly on Viki.

References

External links
Official website
Official website (Japan)
 
 

South Korean drama web series
2021 web series debuts
2021 web series endings
South Korean LGBT-related television shows
Viki (streaming service) original programming
2020s LGBT-related drama television series
South Korean boys' love television series